The Echunga Football Club is an Australian rules football team that plays in the town of Echunga, South Australia, and plays in Division 1 of the Hills Football League.

Club history 
The Echunga Football Club was founded in 1903 by gold diggers who introduced the game to the town and played on hallowed turf prior to the club's founding. For twenty years the team played challenge matches against other teams from neighbouring towns until the Hills Central Football Association was founded in 1923. The HCFA lasted until 1967 when the association amalgamated with other neighbouring associations to form the current Hills Football League.

With war suspending the game for five years, the Echunga FC's involvement with a formal league now spans eighty-eight years. The Demons have won sixteen A-Grade premierships with thirty-three grand final appearances. After World War II, the club made eight grand finals and won six premierships.

Premierships 

 A-Grade: 1925, 1939, 1945, 1947, 1950, 1951, 1953, 1955, 1971, 1972, 1995, 1996, 2000, 2011, 2013, 2014
 B-Grade: 1968, 1975, 1979, 2000
 Senior Colts: 1967, 1968, 1970, 1976, 1993
 Junior Colts: 1972, 1992, 2001, 2009
 Mini Colts: 1980

References

External links 
 Echunga FC Website

Australian rules football clubs in South Australia
Australian rules football clubs established in 1903
1903 establishments in Australia